Preston Griffall (born June 6, 1984) is an American luger who has competed since 1995. He finished 8th and 14th in the doubles event at the 2006 and 2014 Olympics, respectively. Griffall's best finish at the FIL World Luge Championships was 6th in the doubles at Park City, Utah in 2005.

A native of Salt Lake City, Utah, Griffall co-owns a landscaping business in Lake Placid, New York with fellow American luger Jonathan Myles.  While still owning a landscaping business he still finds time to train for upcoming races.

Griffall is also currently in the United States National Guard in the state of Utah. He completed Basic Combat Training in Fort Leonard Wood, Missouri and Advanced Individual Training in Fort Jackson, South Carolina. He serves as a 42A – Human Resources Specialist.

Griffall competed in the 2015 season of American Ninja Warrior where he made it to the Las Vegas finals, but fell just before finishing Stage 1.

References

2006 luge men's doubles results
FIL-Luge profile
KSL-TV in Salt Lake City in 2005 announcing Griffal's making the 2006 team
USA Luge profile of Griffall and Mortensen
US Olympic Committee profile

External links

 
 
 
 

1984 births
Living people
American male lugers
Olympic lugers of the United States
Lugers at the 2006 Winter Olympics
Lugers at the 2014 Winter Olympics
Sportspeople from New York (state)
Sportspeople from Salt Lake City
American Ninja Warrior contestants
U.S. Army World Class Athlete Program